Security Bureau may refer to:

Security Bureau (Hong Kong)
National Police Agency Security Bureau (Japan), a branch of the National Police Agency

See also
Intelligence Bureau (disambiguation)